Saladin McCullough (born July 17, 1975) is a former American football running back who played three seasons in the Canadian Football League with the Edmonton Eskimos, Calgary Stampeders and Saskatchewan Roughriders. He first enrolled at Pasadena City College before transferring to El Camino Junior College and lastly the University of Oregon. McCullough was also a member of the Los Angeles Dragons and Los Angeles Xtreme. His brother Sultan McCullough played in the NFL for the Washington Redskins.

Early years
McCullough played high school football at John Muir High School in Pasadena, California. He set career school records by accumulating 4,429 rushing yards, 73 touchdowns and 5,748 all-purpose yards.

College career
McCullough played for the Pasadena City Lancers of Pasadena City College in 1994, recording 725 yards and six touchdowns in seven games. He played for the El Camino Junior College Warriors in 1995, rushing for 1,090 yards and 12 touchdowns in ten games with 8.4 yards per carry.

McCullough played for the Oregon Ducks of the University of Oregon from 1996 to 1997. He set a school record for rushing touchdowns by scoring fifteen in seven games in 1996, earning honorable mention All-Pac-10 accolades. He recorded 1,343 rushing yards on 267 carries his senior year in 1997. McCullough also scored a 93-yard return for a touchdown on the first kickoff of the Ducks' 1997 season.

Professional career
McCullough played in one game for the Edmonton Eskimos during the 1999 season. He played for the Los Angeles Dragons of the Spring Football League in 2000. McCullough was selected by the Los Angeles Xtreme with the 464th pick in XFL Draft. He recorded five rushing touchdowns and one receiving touchdown for the Extreme in 2001. McCullough played in thirteen games for the Calgary Stampeders in 2003, recording 734 rushing yards and three touchdowns. He also accumulated 298 receiving yards on 32 receptions. McCullough played in one game for the Saskatchewan Roughriders during the 2004 season. He spent the pre season with the San Francisco 49ers in 2002, but was released.

References

External links
Just Sports Stats
College stats

Living people
1975 births
Players of American football from California
American football running backs
Canadian football running backs
African-American players of American football
African-American players of Canadian football
Pasadena City Lancers football players
El Camino Warriors football players
Oregon Ducks football players
Edmonton Elks players
Los Angeles Xtreme players
Calgary Stampeders players
Saskatchewan Roughriders players
Sportspeople from Los Angeles County, California
People from Monterey Park, California
21st-century African-American sportspeople
20th-century African-American sportspeople